Luancheng District is one of eight districts of the prefecture-level city of Shijiazhuang, the capital of Hebei Province, North China. Luancheng is a mostly rural district covering the southeast outskirts of Shijiazhuang.

In 2004, some parts of Luancheng were ceded to divisions of the urban area of Shijiazhuang, because Shijiazhuang is undergoing rapid development and its current geographical size doesn't meet the demands.

Administrative divisions
Towns:
Luancheng Town, Qiema, Yehe, Douyu, Loudi

Townships:
Nangao Township, Liulintun Township, Xiying Township

Climate

Transport 
Luancheng District is served by the Shijiazhuang Luancheng Airport .

References

County-level divisions of Hebei
Shijiazhuang

sr:Луанченг